Mark Edward Marquess (born March 24, 1947) is an American college baseball coach.  He served as the head coach of the Stanford Cardinal baseball team from 1977 to 2017.

Early life and professional baseball career
Born and raised in Stockton, California, Marquess graduated from Stagg High School in Stockton in 1965, then attended Stanford University from 1965 to 1969, where he played on the Stanford Cardinal baseball team at first base from 1967 to 1969 and football team from 1966 to 1968 at quarterback, split end, defensive back, and punt returner.

At Stanford, Marquess was a member of Delta Tau Delta International Fraternity. His freshman year roommate at Stanford was Mitt Romney, who went on to become Governor of Massachusetts and the Republican nominee for President in 2012.

Selected by the Chicago White Sox in the 25th round of the 1969 Major League Baseball draft, Marquess played minor league baseball for the White Sox organization from 1969 to 1973, the last year as a player-coach for the Iowa Oaks, the White Sox' top affiliate.

Coaching career
From 1972 to 1976, Marquess was an assistant coach at Stanford under Ray Young before being promoted to head coach in 1977.

In his 41 years at Stanford, he compiled a record of 1,627–878–7 (.649). His teams made the postseason 23 times, and had a record of 109–50 there. His teams had a 65–25 record in the NCAA Regionals,  a 10–2 record. in the NCAA Super Regionals, and a 34–23 record in the College World Series, with back-to-back national titles in 1987 and 1988.  He is a member of the Stanford Athletic Hall of Fame. He announced his retirement in 2016.

Head coaching records
The following is a table of Marquess's yearly records as an NCAA head baseball coach.

International coaching
USA Baseball Olympic Head Coach (1988)
USA Baseball Head Coach (1981, 1987, 1988)
USA Baseball Assistant Coach (1984)
Gold Medal (1981 Intercontinental Cup)
Gold Medal (1981 World Games)
Silver Medal (1987 Intercontinental Cup)
International Coach of the Year (1988)

See also
List of current NCAA Division I baseball coaches
List of college baseball coaches with 1,100 wins

References

1947 births
Living people
All-American college baseball players
Stanford Cardinal baseball coaches
Stanford Cardinal baseball players
Pan American Games medalists in baseball
Pan American Games gold medalists for the United States
Appleton Foxes players
Mobile White Sox players
Asheville Tourists players
Knoxville Sox players
Iowa Oaks players
Baseball players at the 1967 Pan American Games
Medalists at the 1967 Pan American Games
Baseball players from Stockton, California